Ingolstadt  is an independent city on the Danube in Upper Bavaria with 139,553 inhabitants (as of June 30, 2022). Around half a million people live in the metropolitan area. Ingolstadt is the second largest city in Upper Bavaria after Munich and the fifth largest city in Bavaria after Munich, Nuremberg, Augsburg and Regensburg. The city passed the mark of 100,000 inhabitants in 1989 and has since been one of the major cities in Germany. After Regensburg, Ingolstadt is the second largest German city on the Danube.

The city was first mentioned in 806. In the late Middle Ages, the city was one of the capitals of the Bavarian duchies alongside Munich, Landshut and Straubing, which is reflected in the architecture. On March 13, 1472, Ingolstadt became the seat of the first university in Bavaria, which later distinguished itself as the center of the Counter-Reformation. The freethinking Illuminati order was also founded here in 1776 . The city was also a Bavarian state fortress for more than 400 years. The historic old town has been preserved.

There are two colleges in the city. The place is one of the three regional centers in Bavaria.  The city is mainly characterized by the manufacturing industry, such as automobile and mechanical engineering. The unemployment rate was 3.3% in February 2022.

Geography

Ingolstadt uses Central European Time as throughout Germany; the average time lag is 14 minutes.

The city is expanding at the northern and southern banks of the Danube in a wide flat bowl. The Ingolstadt basin borders the Jura foothills, located south and to the north of the Donau-Isar-Hügelland. In the southwest is the Donaumoos while in the east the lowland forests of the Danube reach into the urban area. It is the second-largest hardwood floodplain on the Danube. The Sandrach, the former Southern main branch of the Danube, partly forms the Southern city border. In the north, the Schutter flows through from the west reaching the Danube near the Altstadt.

History and culture
Ingolstadt was first mentioned in a document of Charlemagne on 6 February 806 as "Ingoldes stat", the place of Ingold. Circa 1250, Ingolstadt was granted city status.

Ingolstadt was the capital of the Duchy of Bavaria-Ingolstadt between 1392 and 1447. Ingolstadt was then united with Bavaria-Landshut. Louis VII, Duke of Bavaria ordered the building of the New Castle as well as the Church of Our Lady (Münster zur Schönen Unseren Lieben Frau), also known as "Upper Parish" (Obere Pfarr), whose form was strongly influenced by French Gothic architecture.

In 1472 Louis IX, Duke of Bavaria founded the University of Ingolstadt which became the Ludwig-Maximilians-University. In 1800 it was moved to Landshut and in 1826 eventually to Munich. The University of Ingolstadt was an important defender of the Roman Catholic Church during the Reformation era, led by such notable scholars as Johann Eck.

Ingolstadt is where William IV, Duke of Bavaria wrote and signed the Bavarian Reinheitsgebot in 1516.

In the Battle of Ingolstadt in May 1525, the Black Company – a unit of Franconian farmers and knights fighting on the side of the peasants during the German Peasants' War – took their last stand at Ingolstadt against the Swabian League, all eventually being defeated and killed.

On 30 April 1632, the German field marshal Johann Tserclaes, Count of Tilly died at Ingolstadt during a Swedish siege of the city. The field marshal had been badly wounded in a previous engagement with the Swedes under King Gustavus Adolphus. Ingolstadt proved to be the first fortress in Germany that held out for the entire length of the Swedish siege, and the Swedes eventually withdrew.

The remains of Gustavus Adolphus' horse can be seen in the City Museum. The horse was shot from under the king by one of the cannons inside the fortress, a cannon known as "The Fig". It has remained thus for almost 400 years. In 1748, Adam Weishaupt, the founder of the Order of Illuminati, was born in Ingolstadt. After the French invasion in 1799, the fortress was demolished and the university was relocated to Landshut.

Originally a fortress city, Ingolstadt is enclosed by a medieval defensive wall. The Bavarian fortress (1537–1930) now holds the museum of the Bavarian army. During World War I, future French president Charles de Gaulle was detained there as a prisoner of war. A sappers' drill ground lies next to the river, and two military air bases are located nearby, one used for testing aircraft. The long military tradition of the city is reflected in today's civil and cultural life. Former "off-limit" military training areas have been converted into well-used public parks.

Adolf Scherzer composed the "Bayerischen Defiliermarsch". Mary Shelley's Frankenstein was set at the Ingolstädter Alte Anatomie (Old Anatomy Building), now a museum for medical history. Marieluise Fleißer set her play Pioneers in Ingolstadt (1928) in the city.

In 1945, the car manufacturer Auto Union first arrived in the city. The company's original factories in Chemnitz and Zwickau (both then in Soviet-controlled East Germany) were shattered during the war, and were seized by the Soviets as reparations. Auto Union executives initially started a spare parts operation in Ingolstadt in the immediate post-war period, with a view to relocating the entire company to the region. With the help of Marshall Plan aid, Auto Union was formally re-founded in Ingolstadt in 1949, ultimately evolving into the modern-era Audi company, after it was taken over by Volkswagen in 1964. Today, Audi is the region's largest employer and now dominates the economy of the city.

Demographics
Population development since 1450:

Cityscape

Main sights
As one of five ducal residences of medieval Bavaria—besides Landshut, Munich, Straubing and Burghausen—the city of Ingolstadt features many Gothic buildings, such as the Herzogskasten ('old ducal castle', ca. 1255) and the New Castle, which was built from 1418 onwards. The largest church is the Gothic hall church of Our Lady (Liebfrauenmunster), which was begun in 1425. The church was built to serve as a second parish church beside Saint Maurice as well as the burial place for Louis and his family and intended to be the official burial place for the future Dukes of Bavaria-Ingolstadt. Its peculiar and rare angle of footprint was emulated in the 20th century built Cathedral of Newark. Also, the churches of Saint Maurice (1235) and of the Gnadenthal and Franciscan monasteries date from the Gothic era. The Kreuztor (1385) is one of the remaining gates of the old city wall and to this day the key landmark of the city. The Gothic Old City Hall was constructed in the 14th century and later altered several times.

The Baroque era is represented by the Old Anatomy Building of the university (1723–1736, designed by Gabriel de Gabrieli) and the church St. Maria de Victoria, which was built by the Asam brothers (1732–1736). The church of the Augustinians of Johann Michael Fischer (1736) was completely destroyed in World War II.

Many buildings of the neo-classical fortification of Leo von Klenze have been preserved, such as the Reduit Tilly and the towers Baur and Triva.

As well as being the home of the headquarters of the car manufacturer Audi, the town is also home to Audi's museum mobile, which is open to the public and presents historic exhibits and offers guided tours.

Parks and natural areas
Ingolstadt is a green city with numerous parks, green spaces and forests. The most prominent of these is the "Glacis", formerly an open space in front of the city walls, now surrounding the historic city centre. It functions as a "green belt" and a buffer area between traffic, residential areas and schools. It is possible to traverse it using spacious paths for pedestrians and cyclists, with a good view of the site of the former fortifications, including a well-preserved section of the ditch. It contained the former  and was the site of the Landesgartenschau in 1992. Klenzepark is south of the Danube river, opposite the Ingolstadt old town. In the warm seasons, about 100,000 visitors use the park every month, mostly young people. While about 75% of the park visitors come from Ingolstadt and the surrounding area, the remaining approximately 25% travel from more distant places.

The biggest forest in Ingolstadt is the Auwald ("riverside forest", also called "Schüttel"). It is found on both the northern and southern banks of the Danube, and is one of the biggest well-preserved river forests in Germany, extending mainly from Neuburg to Ingolstadt with extensions to the city centre. The forest serves as a natural reserve, with parts containing unique vegetation or acting as a wildlife reserve.

The Danube river runs through Ingolstadt, flowing west to east. In the area of Ingolstadt, the Danube is between 80 and 100 metres wide and flows past Ingolstadt's old town.

Schools

Ingolstadt School of Management
Ingolstadt is home to the Ingolstadt School of Management, which is the department of business administration and economics of the Catholic University of Eichstätt-Ingolstadt. In national rankings, the business school regularly scores among the top ten. The faculty maintains a large network of partner universities for international educational exchange.

The Ingolstadt School of management offers bachelor's and master's degrees in business administration. Among the academic programs offered are also executive MBA and doctoral degrees.

Technische Hochschule Ingolstadt
Technische Hochschule Ingolstadt (THI) is a university for technology, computer sciences and business administration. With approximately 6,000 students, it is the biggest educational institution in Ingolstadt.

Several scholarship programmes supported by companies such as Siemens and Conti Temic (Continental AG) provide gifted students with financial assistance during their studies. These students deepen their practical experience by working at these organizations.

THI offers several undergraduate and graduate programmes.

Sports
The sports life of the city is based on the 83 registered sports clubs. The biggest sports club is the MTV 1881 Ingolstadt, with over 3000 registered members in 16 branches. In total, the sports clubs in Ingolstadt have more than 41,000 members.

Ingolstadt is especially known for ice hockey and association football. ERC Ingolstadt, founded in 1964, plays in the German Ice Hockey League since the 2002–03 season. With the exception of its season of debut and 2007–08, the club has reached the national playoffs every year , and has reached the semi-finals three times. They won the German Ice Hockey League Championship in 2014.

The football club FC Ingolstadt 04 came into existence in 2004 after the merger of the football branches of MTV Ingolstadt and ESV Ingolstadt. In the 2007–08 season, it was promoted from the third-highest division at the time, Regionalliga Süd to 2. Bundesliga. In the 2008–09 season, it was relegated to the penultimate place, but was promoted again in 2010-11 and remained in 2. Bundesliga till 2015. In 2015, Ingolstadt won the 2. Bundesliga and were promoted to the country's highest league, the Bundesliga. During their first season in the Bundesliga, Ingolstadt finished in 11th place. They were relegated to 2. Bundesliga by the end of the 2016–17 season.

Literary references
Ingolstadt is one of the many settings in Mary Shelley's novel Frankenstein. Primarily, Victor Frankenstein attends university in Ingolstadt. It is also widely regarded as the place where the un-named monster was created. The musical version of the novel, Frankenstein – A New Musical has many scenes set in Ingolstadt.

Ingolstadt is also a pivotal location in The Illuminatus! Trilogy by Robert Shea and Robert Anton Wilson.

The sixth scene of "Mother Courage and Her Children" by "Bertolt Brecht" is set in Ingolstadt, when count Tilly died in 1632, during the "Thirty Years War".

Rainer Werner Fassbinder's 1971 film Pioneers in Ingolstadt is set in the town.

The X-Files episode "The Post-Modern Prometheus" makes a reference to the University of Ingolstadt. This was an allusion to Frankenstein, as the episode contained numerous Frankenstein references, and the full title of Frankenstein is "Frankenstein: or, The Modern Prometheus".

In the Terra Ignota series, Ingolstadt is the capital of Gordian, one of the world's seven Hives.

Twin towns – sister cities

Ingolstadt is twinned with:

 Aurangabad, India
 Carrara, Italy
 Central AO (Moscow), Russia
 Moscow, Russia
 Foshan, China
 Grasse, France
 Győr, Hungary
 Kirkcaldy, Scotland, United Kingdom
 Kragujevac, Serbia
 Manisa, Turkey
 Murska Sobota, Slovenia
 Opole, Poland

Organizations and clubs
MTV 1881 Ingolstadt, Ingolstadt's major sports club
FC Ingolstadt 04, Footballclub in 2. Bundesliga (II)
Grün-Weiß Ingolstadt, Footballclub in Kreisklasse (IX)
Ingolstadt Schanzer, Baseball team in 2. Bundesliga (II)
ERC Ingolstadt, Ice hockey team in DEL (I)
The Bavarian Illuminati
Ingolstadt Dukes American football in GFL (I)

Notable people
Philipp Apian (1531–1589), mathematician
Adam Weishaupt (1748–1830), philosopher
Marieluise Fleißer (1901–1974), author and playwright
Michael Heltau (born 1933), German-Austrian actor
Erich Kellerhals (1939–2017), businessman
Horst Seehofer (born 1949), politician
Eva Bulling-Schröter (born 1956), politician
Stefan Klingele (born 1967), conductor
Reinhard Brandl (born 1977), politician
Christian Engelhart (born 1986), racing driver

Notes

References

External links

Ingolstadt Official website of the city (in German)
Virtual tour through Ingolstadt (in German, but more images than text)
Catholic University Eichstätt-Ingolstadt
University of Applied Sciences (Fachhochschule)
Museum of the Bavarian Army (in German)
Audi
A history of Ingolstadt by Kurt Scheurer (in German)
A biography of Marieluise Fleißer (in German)
Pioniere in Ingolstadt by Marieluise Fleißer (in

 
Cities in Bavaria
Populated places on the Danube